Orthalicidae (orthalicid land snails) are a family of tropical air-breathing land snails, terrestrial pulmonate gastropod mollusks are classified in the subfamily Orthalicoidea of the order Stylommatophora. 

They are medium-sized to large snails, from about 3 cm (about 1.2 inches) to 9 cm (about 3.5 inches) in shell length

Taxonomy 
In former times, this family was often known as the Bulimulidae, but this term may also denote what today is the subfamily Bulimulinae. The subfamily Bulimulinae replaces the former family Bulimulidae Crosse & P. Fischer, 1873.

2005 taxonomy 
The Orthalicidae belong to the Orthalicoidea, a superfamily in the order Sigmurethra. Like other stylommatophorans, the Sigmurethra belong to the suborder Helicina. Among the three subfamilies of Orthalicidae, the Bulimulinae are the most diverse, consisting of three tribes:

subfamily Amphibuliminae P. Fischer, 1873 - synonym Peltellinae Gray, 1855 (check decision of International Commission on Zoological Nomenclature for Peltellinae) - 17 species
subfamily Bulimulinae Tryon, 1867 - 1243 species
 tribe Bulimulini Tryon, 1867 - synonyms: Bulimidae Guilding, 1828 (inv.); Berendtiinae P. Fischer & Crosse, 1872; Bothiembryontidae Iredale, 1937
 tribe Odontostomini Pilsbry & Vanatta, 1898 - 125 species
 tribe Simpulopsini Schileyko, 1999 - synonym: Tomogeridae Jousseaume, 1877
subfamily Orthalicinae Albers, 1850 - synonym: Liguidae Pilsbry, 1891 - 83 species

2010 taxonomy 
Breure et al. (2010) elevated Bulimulinae to Bulimulidae, Odontostomini to Odontostomidae, Amphibuliminae to Amphibulimidae.

2012 taxonomy 
Breure & Romero (2012) confirmed previous results from 2010, additionally they elevated Simpulopsini to Simpulopsidae.

Genera 
Genera within the family Orthalicidae include:
 Aposcutalus Dutra & Leme, 1985
 Clathrorthalicus Strebel, 1909
Corona Albers, 1850
 † Cortana Salvador & Simone, 2013 
 Hemibulimus Martens, 1885
 Kara Strebel, 1910
 Liguus Montfort, 1810
 Orthalicus Beck, 1837 - type genus of the family Orthalicidae
 Paeniscutalus Wurtz, 1947
 Porphyrobaphe Shuttleworth, 1856
 Quechua Strebel, 1910
 Scholvienia Strebel, 1910
 Sultana Shuttleworth, 1856

References

Further reading 
  Neubert E. & Janssen R. (2004). "Die Typen und Typoide des Natur-Museums Senckenberg, 84: Mollusca: Gastropoda: Pulmonata: Orthalicoidea: Bulimulidae (2), Orthalicidae, Placostylidae". Archiv für Molluskenkunde 133: 193-297. abstract.
 Ramirez J. & Ramírez R. (2010). "Análisis de la estructura secundaria del LSU rRNA mitocondrial de caracoles terrestres peruanos (Orthalicidae: Gastropoda) / Analysis of the secondary structure of mitochondrial LSU rRNA of Peruvian land snails (Orthalicidae: Gastropoda)." Revista Peruana de Biología 17(1): 53-57. PDF.
 Ramirez J., Ramírez R., Romero P., Chumbe A. & Ramírez P. (2009). "Posición evolutiva de caracoles terrestres peruanos (Orthalicidae) entre los Stylommatophora (Mollusca: Gastropoda) / Evolutionary position of Peruvian land snails (Orthalicidae) among Stylommatophora (Mollusca: Gastropoda)". Revista Peruana de Biología 16(1): 51-56. PDF.

External links